Bathing Woman with Raised Arms is a 1921 bronze sculpture by Aristide Maillol. Since 1964 it has been exhibited in the Jardin du Carrousel next to the Tuileries Garden.

References 

1921 sculptures
Bronze sculptures
Nude sculptures
Sculptures by Aristide Maillol
Sculptures in Paris